The 2006/07 FIS Freestyle Skiing World Cup was the twenty eight World Cup season in freestyle skiing organised by International Ski Federation. The season started on 9 December 2006 and ended on 3 March 2007. This season included five disciplines: aerials, moguls, dual moguls, ski cross and halfpipe.

Dual mogul events returned on world cup calendar as a separate title from moguls for last time.

Men

Moguls

Aerials

Ski Cross

Halfpipe

Ladies

Moguls

Aerials

Ski Cross

Halfpipe

Men's standings

Overall 

Standings after 20 races.

Moguls 

Standings after 7 races.

Aerials 

Standings after 6 races.

Ski Cross 

Standings after 3 races.

Halfpipe 

Standings after 1 race.

Dual moguls 

Standings after 3 races.

Ladies' standings

Overall 

Standings after 19 races.

Moguls 

Standings after 7 races.

Aerials 

Standings after 6 races.

Ski Cross 

Standings after 3 races.

Halfpipe 

Standings after 1 race.

Dual moguls 

Standings after 2 races.

Nations Cup

Overall 

Standings after 39 races.

Men 

Standings after 20 races.

Ladies 

Standings after 19 races.

Footnotes

References

Freestyle Skiing World Cup
2007 in freestyle skiing
FIS Freestyle Skiing World Cup